The following lists events that happened during 1980 in New Zealand.

Population
 Estimated population as of 31 December: 3,176,400
 Increase since 31 December 1979: 12,500 (0.40%)
 Males per 100 females: 99.2

Incumbents

Regal and viceregal
Head of State – Elizabeth II
Governor-General – The Rt Hon Sir Keith Holyoake KG GCMG CH QSO, followed by The Hon Sir David Beattie GCMG GCVO QSO QC.

Government
The 39th New Zealand Parliament continued. The third National Party government was in power.

Speaker of the House – Richard Harrison.
Prime Minister – Robert Muldoon
Deputy Prime Minister – Brian Talboys.
Minister of Finance – Robert Muldoon.
Minister of Foreign Affairs – Brian Talboys.
Attorney-General – Jim McLay.
Chief Justice — Sir Ronald Davison

An attempt by high-ranking ministers Derek Quigley, Jim McLay, and Jim Bolger to replace Muldoon as prime minister (known as the "colonels' coup") with the deputy prime minister Talboys collapsed as a result of Talboys' unwillingness to actively campaign against Muldoon.

Three by-elections occurred.
In East Coast Bays, the sitting National MP Frank Gill resigned to take up the post of New Zealand's ambassador to the United States. The seat was won by Gary Knapp for the Social Credit Party.
In Northern Maori the MP Matiu Rata, who had left Labour the year before, resigned and recontested the seat for Mana Motuhake. The seat was won by the Labour Party candidate Bruce Gregory.
In Onehunga a by-election was called after the death of Labour MP Frank Rogers. The seat was won again for the Labour Party by Fred Gerbic.

Parliamentary opposition
 Leader of the Opposition –  Bill Rowling (Labour).
Social Credit Party – Bruce Beetham

Main centre leaders
Mayor of Auckland – Dove-Myer Robinson then Colin Kay
Mayor of Hamilton – Ross Jansen
Mayor of Wellington – Michael Fowler
Mayor of Christchurch – Hamish Hay
Mayor of Dunedin – Clifford George (Cliff) Skeggs

Events
 A strike at Kinleith Mill lasted for 80 days, and broke the government's wage and price freeze.
 The first Sweetwaters Music Festival was held near Ngāruawāhia.
 The carless days scheme finished.
 Saturday trading allowed (lifting the 1945 restriction), although Sunday trading by most retail outlets apart from dairies and takeaway food outlets remained banned.

Arts and literature
Philip Temple wins the Robert Burns Fellowship.

See 1980 in art, 1980 in literature, :Category:1980 books

Music

New Zealand Music Awards
ALBUM OF THE YEAR  Sharon O'Neill – Sharon O'Neill
SINGLE OF THE YEAR  Jon Stevens – Montego Bay
TOP MALE VOCALIST  Jon Stevens
TOP FEMALE VOCALIST  Sharon O'Neill
TOP GROUP  The Crocodiles
MOST PROMISING MALE VOCALIST  Jon Stevens
MOST PROMISING GROUP  Crocodiles
PRODUCER OF THE YEAR Dave MaCrae & Kevin Oliff – Pacific Eardrum (Pacific Eardrum)
ENGINEER OF THE YEAR  Tony Burns – Pacific Eardrum (Pacific Eardrum)
BEST COVER  Peter Burt – Pacific Eardrum (Pacific Eardrum)
OUTSTANDING CONTRIBUTION  Terence O’Neill-Joyce

See: 1980 in music

Performing arts

 Benny Award presented by the Variety Artists Club of New Zealand to Peter Evans.

Radio and television
Television One and South Pacific Television are merged into Television New Zealand.
The national newsroom is moved from Avalon in Lower Hutt to Auckland.  
Feltex Television Awards:
Best Information: Country Calendar
Best Documentary: From the Ocean to the Sky
Best Drama: Children of Fire Mountain
Best Speciality: 1979 SPT International Track Series
Best Children's: Spot On
Best Script: Episode five of Children of Fire Mountain
Best Actor: Terence Cooper in Children of Fire Mountain
Best Actress: Ginette McDonald as Sandra Allenby in It's Your Child
Best Television Entertainer: David McPhail

See: 1980 in New Zealand television, 1980 in television, List of TVNZ television programming, :Category:Television in New Zealand, :Category:New Zealand television shows, Public broadcasting in New Zealand

Film
Beyond Reasonable Doubt
Goodbye Pork Pie
Lincoln County Incident
Squeeze

See: :Category:1980 film awards, 1980 in film, List of New Zealand feature films, Cinema of New Zealand, :Category:1980 films

Sport

Athletics
 Don Greig wins his first national title in the men's marathon, clocking 2:17:08 on 15 March in Christchurch, while the first women's championship is won by Beverley Shingles in 2:44:48.

Chess
 The 87th New Zealand Chess Championship is held in Upper Hutt. There is a three-way tie between Ewen McGowen Green, Ortvin Sarapu, and Vernon A. Small.

Horse racing

Harness racing
 New Zealand Trotting Cup: Hands Down
 Auckland Trotting Cup: Delightful Lady

Olympic Games

Summer Olympics

 Only four of the 98 New Zealand competitors originally selected go to the Summer Olympics because of the Western boycott.

Winter Olympics

 New Zealand sends a team of five alpine skiers.

Paralympic Games

Summer Paralympics

Winter Paralympics

 New Zealand sends its first team to a Winter Paralympics, consisting of three competitors in one sport.

Rugby union
 In the 1980 New Zealand rugby union tour of Australia in June / July Australia won two of the three tests, retaining the Bledisloe Cup
 23 July: The All Blacks beat Fiji 30–6 at ANZ National Stadium
 13 September: The All Blacks beat Fiji 33–0 at Eden Park
 8 October—1 November: All Blacks tour of North America and Wales
 Auckland defend the Ranfurly Shield against five challengers (Horowhenua 37–3, King Country 29–3, Poverty Bay 19–12, Southland 25–3, and Otago 43—13) before losing to Waikato 3–7. Waikato then beat Thames Valley 16—7 and Taranaki 15—0 to retain the shield at the end of the season.
 National Provincial Championship winners:
 Division 1: Manawatu.
 Division 2 North: Waikato
 Division 2 South: Mid Canterbury
 The North vs South match is played in Palmerston North and is won 13–9 by North.

Soccer
 New Zealand National Soccer League won by Mount Wellington
 The Chatham Cup is won by Mount Wellington who beat Dunedin City 2–0 in the final.
 New Zealand was unplaced in the Oceania Cup tournament held in New Caledonia

Births
 7 January: Campbell Johnstone, rugby player 
 15 January: Jason Cayless, rugby league player.
 31 January: Sam Harris, rugby league and rugby union player.
 2 February: Kyle Pontifex, hockey player.
 10 February: Riki Flutey, rugby union player.
 21 February: Clinton Toopi, rugby league player.
 4 March: Scott Hamilton, rugby union player.
 6 March: Gareth Fleming, musician.
 9 March: Trent Croad, Australian rules footballer.
 14 April: Jeremy Smith, rugby league player.
 15 April: Willie Mason, rugby league player.
 16 April: David Hall, rugby union player.
 22 April: Clarke Dermody, rugby union player.
 25 April: Phil Burrows, hockey player.
 25 April: Bruce Martin, cricketer.
 7 May: Jeetan Patel, cricketer.
 8 May: Steven Ferguson, canoer and swimmer.
 10 May: Brad Carter, musician.
 13 May: Ken Uprichard, archer.
 21 May: Anika Moa, singer/songwriter.
 24 May: William Trubridge, free-diver.
 30 May: Henry Fa'afili, rugby league player.
 16 June: Henry Perenara, rugby league player.
 7 July: Benjamin Mitchell, actor.
 22 July: Scott Dixon, racing car driver.
 26 July: Jacinda Ardern, 40th Prime Minister of New Zealand
 31 July (in Samoa): Mils Muliaina, rugby union player.
 10 August: Pua Magasiva, actor.
 12 August: Blair Hopping, hockey player.
 14 August: Nick Evans, rugby union player.
 31 August: Hayden Shaw, hockey player.
 1 September: Ryan Archibald, hockey player.
 4 September: Lucie Silvas, singer/songwriter.
 9 September: David Fa'alogo, rugby player.
 12 September: Clifford Manua, rugby player.
 23 September: Shannon Paku, rugby player.
 25 September: Luc Mullinder, Canadian Football player.
 10 October: Tasesa Lavea, rugby union and rugby league player.
 29 October: Kaine Robertson, rugby player.
 4 November: Jerry Collins, rugby player.
 7 November: James Franklin, cricketer.
 8 November: Brent Webb, rugby player.
 23 November: Kirk Penney, basketball player.
 25 November: Michael Wilson, soccer player.
 29 November: Aaron Mauger, rugby player.
 5 December: Heath Blackgrove, cyclist.
 17 December: Tim Youngson, musician.
 24 December: Andrew Barron, football (soccer) player.
 31 December: Richie McCaw, rugby player.
 Ben Goodger, lead developer of the Firefox web browser.

Deaths
 8 January: Logan Sloane, politician.
 29 March: Harold David London, public servant, philatelist, cycling administrator, editor and local historian
 12 April: Clark McConachy, snooker and billiards player.
 15 May: Len Lye, sculptor, artist, writer and film-maker.
 14 July:Norman Shelton, politician.
 26 July: Bertie Victor Cooksley, politician.
 2 August: Verdun Scott, cricketer.
 5 August: William Perrett Mead, engineer, skier, tramper, ranger and writer.
 9 August: Denis Glover, poet and publisher.
 28 November: Air Commodore Keith Caldwell MC DFC, WWI flying ace.
 28 November: Bernard Fergusson, Baron Ballantrae, Governor-General.
 5 December: Don Taylor, cricketer.

See also
List of years in New Zealand
Timeline of New Zealand history
History of New Zealand
Military history of New Zealand
Timeline of the New Zealand environment
Timeline of New Zealand's links with Antarctica

References

External links

 
New Zealand
Years of the 20th century in New Zealand